The 2022 Women's Ric Charlesworth Classic was the third edition of the women's Ric Charlesworth Classic, an Australian field hockey competition organised by Hockey WA. It was held from 26 March – 2 April 2022 in Perth, Australia.

The Highlanders won the tournament for the first time, defeating the Breakers 3–1 in penalties after the final finished as a 3–3 draw. The Outbacks finished in third place, defeating the Suns 3–2.

Teams

 Breakers
 Highlanders
 Outbacks
 Suns

Results

Preliminary round

Fixtures

Classification round

Third and fourth place

Final

Statistics

Final standings

References

External links
Official website

Field hockey leagues in Australia
Professional sports leagues in Australia
2020 establishments in Australia
Sports leagues established in 2020
Sports competitions in Perth, Western Australia